The Port of Cape Town is the port of the city of Cape Town, South Africa. It is situated in Table Bay.

Because of its position along one of the world's busiest trade routes it is one of the busiest ports in South Africa, handling the largest amount of fresh fruit and second only to Durban as a container port. The port also has significant repair and maintenance facilities that are used by several large fishing fleets and parts of the West African oil industry. Because of the many tourist attractions offered by Cape Town and its surrounding region, many cruise ships also berth in the port.

History

The history of the port follows that of Cape Town, which traces its roots back to 6 April 1652 when Jan van Riebeeck of the Dutch East India Company (VOC) established a revictualing station there.  Earlier explorers had called it Table Bay from the late 15th century onwards.

The first harbour construction was a jetty built in 1654 by Jan van Riebeeck. Ships all anchored in the bay, and goods were transferred to and from the shore by smaller vessels. Table Bay is notorious for violent winter storms, when the wind blows on to a lee shore. Massive shipping losses were sustained by the Dutch Vereenigde Oostindische Compagnie (VOC), to the extent that eventually Table Bay was closed during the winter months, and ships were ordered to use Simon's Bay (part of False Bay, where Simon's Town is now) in winter.

A vicious storm in 1858, long after the demise of the VOC, saw 30 ships blown ashore and wrecked, with huge loss of life. Lloyd's of London declined all further insurance on ships in Table Bay in winter, resulting in the British Colonial Government starting the construction, in 1860, of the first breakwater. This developed into the Victoria and Alfred Basin, the first safe harbour. There has been extensive expansion since then.

Main areas

The port evolved greatly over the centuries and currently consists of several main components:

 The Ben Schoeman Dock: This is the larger outer dock of the port, where the container terminal is situated.
 The Duncan Dock: This is the smaller and the older inner dock, containing the multi-purpose and fruit terminals as well as a dry dock, repair quay and tanker basin. 
 The yachting marina. 
 The Victoria and Alfred Basins: These were the main piers of the original Cape Town harbour, but now house the Victoria & Alfred Waterfront. However, these basins are still used by smaller commercial vessels such as fishing and pleasure boats and also by smaller passenger cruise ships.

Port operations

The port is open 24 hours a day, 7 days a week. All vessels berthing in the port require a pilot on board. Transfer is by pilot boat but plans have been made to introduce a helicopter transfer service.

Several tugs, launches, workboats and other specialised vessels are operated by the port.

During the 2005/06 financial year, the Port of Cape Town handled 3,400 vessels for a gross tonnage of 48,778,963-gt. Total cargo handled at the port (excluding containers) was 3,718,005 tonnes; container tonnage is estimated at 9.948 million tonnes.

In 2010, the port handled 719,825 TEU.

On 30 June, 2020, Transnet introduced a number of solutions to deal with operational backlogs at the Port of Cape Town, caused by the COVID-19 pandemic in the region.

See also
 List of ports of entry in South Africa
 2021 Transnet Cyberattack

References

External links

 Official website
 
Transport in Cape Town
Cape Town